Ruth Monique Kipoyi (born 15 October 1997), known as Ruth Kipoyi, is a DR Congolese footballer, who plays as a forward for Turkish Women's Football Super League club ALG Spor and the DR Congo women's national team.

Club career 
On 15 July 2021, Kipoyi signed for Tanzanian women's football team Simba Queens, representing the club in the 2021 CAF Women's Champions League CECAFA Qualifiers. The side finished third, failing to qualify for the inaugural CAF Women's Champions League finals. 

In December 2021, she moved to Turkey and joined the Gaziantep-based club ALG Spor to play in the 2021-22 Turkcell Women's Super League. On 9 March 2022 she scored her first professional hat-trick with three goals in a 7-0 league win over Dudullu Spor. She enjoyed the 2021-22 Women's Super League champion title of her team. On 18 August 2022, she debuted in the 2022–23 UEFA Women's Champions League.

International career 
Kipoyi capped for the DR Congo at senior level during the 2020 CAF Women's Olympic Qualifying Tournament (third round). She was selected for the DR Congo squad for their 2022 CAF Africa Women Cup of Nations qualification fixture with Equatorial Guinea prior to the side's withdrawal citing logistical and financial issues.

Career statistics

Honours 
 Turkish Women's Super League
 ALG Spor
 Winners (1): 2021-22

See also 
 List of Democratic Republic of the Congo women's international footballers

References

External links 

1997 births
Living people
Footballers from Kinshasa
Democratic Republic of the Congo women's footballers
Women's association football forwards
Democratic Republic of the Congo women's international footballers
Democratic Republic of the Congo expatriate footballers
Democratic Republic of the Congo expatriate sportspeople in Tanzania
Expatriate women's footballers in Tanzania
Democratic Republic of the Congo expatriate sportspeople in Turkey
Expatriate women's footballers in Turkey
ALG Spor players
Turkish Women's Football Super League players